is the 10th single from the Japanese idol group Idoling!!! and was released under the sub-unit name . It reached number 10 on the Oricon weekly chart and sold 8,444 copies in the first week.

Contents 
Love Magic Fever was released only in a normal edition (CD only).

Track listing

CD

Notes 
 "Love Magic Fever" was used as a theme song for the SEGA game Puyo Puyo 7. This song was the only song performed under the original sub-unit "Puyo Puyo Idoling!!!". Later on, at Idoling!!! 10th live, Idoling!!! performed a song titled "Koi no 20 Rensa!!" under the name Puyo Puyo Idoling!!! consisting all of Idoling!!! members.
 "Snow celebration -everlasting story-", on Liner Notes-ng!!! (album SUNRISE bonus DVD) it was explained that the lyric is a three-years-later story of the original "Snow celebration" song.
 Sub-unit "Puyo Puyo Idoling!!!" members are #7 Erika Yazawa, #8 Phongchi, #12 Yui Kawamura, #13 Serina Nagano, #14 Hitomi Sakai, #15 Nao Asahi, #16 Ami Kikuchi, and #21 Kaede Hashimoto.
 On the Idoling!!! TV show "Idoling!!! Nikki", it was shown that #17 Hitomi Miyake and #21 Kaede Hashimoto asked Sayaka Aoki to write the song "Love Magic Fever". Sayaka Aoki is a female comedian attached to Watanabe Entertainment, the same agency as Miyake and Hashimoto.

References

External links 
 Love Magic Fever on iTunes Japan
 Idoling!!! official site - Fuji TV
 Idoling!!! official site - Pony Canyon
 Idoling!!! official Twitter
 Idoling!!! official Facebook Page
 
 Idoling!!! official Niconico Channel

2009 singles
Idoling!!! songs
2009 songs
Pony Canyon singles